Svetoslav Miletov Georgiev (born 12 April 1977) is a former Bulgarian football player who played as a defender.

Career
Georgiev started his career at his home town Blagoevgrad in local team Pirin. After that he played for CSKA Sofia, Cherno More Varna, Makedonska slava and Marek Dupnitsa.
He signed with Vihren Sandanski in July 2008 for a free transfer. On 9 August 2008 Georgiev made his official debut for Vihren in a match against Levski Sofia. On 11 November of the same year he scored his first goal for the club in a match for the Bulgarian Cup against Lyubimetz 2007.

References

1977 births
Living people
Bulgarian footballers
First Professional Football League (Bulgaria) players
OFC Pirin Blagoevgrad players
PFC CSKA Sofia players
PFC Cherno More Varna players
PFC Pirin Blagoevgrad players
PFC Marek Dupnitsa players
OFC Vihren Sandanski players

Association football defenders
Sportspeople from Blagoevgrad